ClearMeeting is a web conferencing service created and marketed by Audiocast Inc., a company that provides database driven streaming media products and corporate online poor communication systems. ClearMeeting is a tool for adding visual and interactive elements to traditional telephone conference calls. It is sold as an on-demand service, also called SaaS (Software as a Service).

History 

Developed in 2005 by Audiocast Inc. of Northfield, Illinois, United States, ClearMeeting was designed as a platform for giving and viewing slideshow presentations over the web.  It is sold on a per-presenter basis on the company website. As a SaaS, there is no installation of the ClearMeeting application. In 2007, ClearMeeting SA became a certified application on the Salesforce.com AppExchange.

References 

https://web.archive.org/web/20071008150950/http://www.opsource.net/casestudies/OpSourceClearMeetingCS.pdf 
"ClearMeeting Delivers No Frills Web Conferencing for Salesforce.com's AppExchange". Business Wire. Sept 17, 2007. FindArticles.com. 03 Mar. 2008. http://findarticles.com/p/articles/mi_m0EIN/is_2007_Sept_17/ai_n19521080

External links 
ClearMeeting website (https://web.archive.org/web/20130115033558/http://www.clearmeeting.com/)
Salesforce website (http://www.salesforce.com)

Teleconferencing
Collaborative software
Streaming
1997 software